Dato' Seri Utama Mukhriz bin Tun Dr. Mahathir (Jawi: مخرج بن محاضر; born 25 November 1964) is a Malaysian politician who twice served as the 11th and 13th Menteri Besar of Kedah from May 2013 to February 2016 and again from May 2018 to May 2020. He also served as the Deputy Minister of International Trade and Industry in the Barisan Nasional (BN) administration under former Prime Ministers Abdullah Ahmad Badawi and Najib Razak as well as former Minister Mustapa Mohamed from March 2008 to May 2013. He has served as Member of Parliament (MP) for Jerlun from May 2018 to October 2022, from March 2008 to May 2013 and Member of the Kedah State Legislative Assembly (MLA) for Jitra since May 2018 as well as Ayer Hitam from May 2013 to May 2018. He is the third son of Mahathir Mohamad, the 4th, 7th and former Prime Minister of Malaysia. He has been a founding member and 1st President of the Homeland Fighters' Party (PEJUANG) since party foundation in August 2020. He was a founding member, 1st Deputy President and State Chairman of Kedah of the Malaysian United Indigenous Party (BERSATU) from party foundation in September 2016 to his membership termination in May 2020 and too, State Chairman of Kedah of its former coalition, Pakatan Harapan (PH) opposition coalition. He was also a member of the United Malays National Organisation (UMNO), a component party of the Barisan Nasional (BN) coalition, till he left the party with Mahathir in 2016 to found BERSATU. He is one of the two Menteris Besar of Malaysia who represented two different political parties and coalitions.

Business career and personal life
Mukhriz attended Sophia University, in Tokyo, where he received a bachelor's degree in business management (assumed in 1987). He later received another bachelor's degree in marketing after graduating from Boston University (assumed in 1989).

Mukhriz has held various posts in several business firms, which include Opcom Holdings, Kosmo Tech as well as the Malaysian Franchise Association. He was also the executive director of Perdana Peace Global Organisation. He served as Chairman of the Board of Directors of Malaysian cancer vaccine company, Bioven.

Mukhriz married Yang Amat Berbahagia To' Puan Seri Utama Norzieta Zakaria on 14 November 1993, and together, they have four children.

On 27 August 2020, Mukhriz admitted that it was his daughter and son-in-law who were recently arrested by the police for breaching the recovery movement control order (MCO) rules. On 28 August, Mukhriz's daughter, Meera Alyanna Mukhriz, has apologised for breaching recovery movement-control order (RMCO) procedures by staying out past the 12pm closing time at an eatery.

Political career

Pre-parliamentary career
In 2004, he won election to the executive council of UMNO's youth wing, by garnering the highest number of votes of any candidate. He was also seen as a potential candidate for being the deputy chief of UMNO Youth, but he later withdrew his candidacy.

Mukhriz was noted for his continuous efforts in speaking for his father in the events of the rift between Prime Minister Abdullah Ahmad Badawi and his father. In 2006, his father lost a bid to be elected as one of seven delegates from Kubang Pasu to UMNO's general assembly; Mukhriz was elected as one of the seven.

Federal parliamentarian (2008–2013)
In the 2008 Malaysian general election, Mukhriz contested and won the Jerlun Parliament Seat. Before this, he offered himself to contest in Langkawi Parliament Seat but was rejected by 85 out of 91 UMNO branches in Langkawi. However, many Langkawi leaders backed him later. The Jerlun UMNO division welcomed Mukhriz to contest in their Parliament seat and promised to give him full support in the election.

In 2009, Mukhriz contested as a candidate for the new UMNO Youth Chief after the wing's predecessor, Datuk Seri Hishamuddin Hussein released his position. He was rivalled by Khairy Jamaluddin and Khir Toyo. Nominations for the posts coincided with division meetings which took place between October and November 2008. Mukhriz was initially seen as leading in nominations compared to Khairy but eventually lost in the final vote count.

However, a controversy was sparked when Khairy was allowed to contest for the post even though he was found guilty for being involved with money politics by the UMNO Disciplinary Board, while others who were found guilty for the same offence, such as Mohd Ali Rustam who was supposed to contest for the UMNO Vice-President post, were not allowed to contest for their respective posts. However, Khairy denied the allegation, as stated in his blog.

First term as Menteri Besar Kedah (2013–2016)
In the 2013 election, Mukhriz gave up his seat in federal parliament to contest the Kedah State Assembly seat of Ayer Hitam. The move was taken with a view to becoming the Chief Minister of Kedah if the Barisan Nasional coalition could defeat the Pakatan Rakyat (PR) state government led by Azizan Abdul Razak. Mukhriz won Ayer Hitam (defeating the Pan-Malaysian Islamic Party (PAS) incumbent), Barisan Nasional reclaimed the state government, and Mukhriz was sworn in as Chief Minister on 6 May, the day after the election, in the presence of his father.
 
In January 2016, UMNO Kedah leaders, led by Ahmad Bashah Md Hanipah, declare the loss of confidence towards Mukhriz due to "his inability to maintain a united party leadership". The move is widely believed to be a reprisal orchestrated by the Prime Minister Najib Razak's camp in UMNO, which was increasingly infuriated by Mahathir's and Mukhriz's criticisms against Najib. He resigned on 3 February 2016 after losing the majority of support among the assemblymen. Ahmad Bashah, who is also the Bakar Bata assemblyman, succeeded him as the 12th Chief Minister of Kedah. Daughter of Mukhriz, Meera Alyanna Mukhriz expressed her gratitude to the rakyat of Kedah for giving her father a chance to serve the state and its people.

Mukhriz was expelled from UMNO together with Muhyiddin Yassin in June 2016.

Parti Pribumi Bersatu Malaysia (BERSATU) (2016-2020)
In August 2016, Mukhriz together with Mahathir Mohamad, Muhyiddin Yassin, Syed Saddiq Syed Abdul Rahman, Kamarulazman Habibur Rahman, Anina Saadudin and Akhramsyah Sanusi formed Parti Pribumi Bersatu Malaysia (PPBM or BERSATU).

Mukhriz was the Deputy President of BERSATU and the Chairman of Pakatan Harapan in Kedah.

Second term as Menteri Besar Kedah (2018-2020)
In the 2018 general election, the Pakatan Harapan (PH) coalition led by former Prime Minister Mahathir Mohamad, Mukhriz's father, won 18 of the 36 state assembly seats.

He took his oath of office before Kedah Sultan Tunku Sallehuddin Ibni Almarhum Sultan Badlishah in a ceremony held in Istana Anak Bukit.

On 22 January 2020, Mukhriz said starting the new year bringing in investments from China is a good sign for the state. He shake hands with Jin Yeuhua at a signing ceremony at Wisma Darul Aman.

On 29 January 2020, Mukhriz said Kedah recorded a revenue of RM726.89 million in 2019, surpassing the target of RM710 million set by the state government last year. 

On 17 May 2020, he resigned as Chief Minister of Kedah mentioning he couldn't hold on to majority amongst his state assemblymen and thus relinquished his position as Chief Minister of Kedah.

Election results

Honours 
  :
  Knight Commander of the Order of Loyalty to Sultan Abdul Halim Muadzam Shah (DHMS) - Dato' Paduka (2013)
  Knight Grand Commander of the Exalted Order of the Crown of Kedah (SPMK) - Dato' Seri (2014)
  Member of the Supreme Order of Sri Mahawangsa (DMK) – Dato' Seri Utama (2019)
  :
  Knight Grand Commander of the Order of the Life of the Crown of Kelantan (SJMK) - Dato' (2019)
  :
  Grand Commander of the Order of Malacca (DGSM) - Datuk Seri (2019)
  :
  Knight Companion of the Order of Loyalty to Negeri Sembilan (DSNS) - Dato' (2003)
  :
  Knight Companion of the Order of the Crown of Pahang (DIMP) - Dato' (2010)

References

External links

Home pages
 Mukhriz Mahathir's Blog (Launched September 2008)
 Mukhriz Mahathir's Fan Club

Others
 Crowded race for a hot seat
 Mukhriz stands by Youth decision
 Mahathir's son following in his footsteps
 Peace Malaysia To Be Institutionalised In December – Mukhriz 

1964 births
Living people
People from Kedah
Malaysian people of Malay descent
Malaysian people of Minangkabau descent
Malaysian people of Malayali descent
Malaysian politicians of Indian descent
Malaysian Muslims
Malaysian businesspeople
Children of prime ministers of Malaysia
Mahathir Mohamad family
Former Malaysian United Indigenous Party politicians
Former United Malays National Organisation politicians
Independent politicians in Malaysia
Members of the Dewan Rakyat
Members of the Kedah State Legislative Assembly
Chief Ministers of Kedah
Kedah state executive councillors
MARA Junior Science College alumni
Sophia University alumni
Boston University School of Management alumni
21st-century Malaysian politicians
Members of the Supreme Order of Sri Mahawangsa